Torgeir Knag Fylkesnes (born 4 June 1975 in Tromsø) is a Norwegian politician for the Socialist Left Party. He has been the party's deputy leader since 2019 and an MP for Troms since 2013.

Early life
Fylkenes was born in Tromsø, but spent two years of his childhood in Botswana from 1983 to 1985. He has been communications advisor for Norwegian Nurses Organisation and communications leader for the Norwegian technology council.

Political career

Parliament
Fylkesnes was elected as a deputy member to the Storting in the 2001 election, which he was for only one term. 
He was later elected a regular member in the 2013 election and has won re-election since. 
In parliament, he was a member of the Standing Committee on Education, Research and Church Affairs from 2013 until December 2015 when he moved to the Committee on Business and Industry.

Deputy leader
On 30 March 2019, he was elected deputy leader of the Socialist Left Party, succeeding Snorre Valen. He won with 108 votes against 100 for his opponent, Kari Elisabeth Kaski.

Few days before the 2021 election, Aftenposten revealed that Fylkesnes had owned a parliamentary apartment for free while also owning and renting an apartment in Oslo since 2013. He stated that he wasn't concerned how the ownership of the Oslo apartment would effect his economic status. He also argued that being an MP in an uncertain job, and that he wanted a place for his family to live, which is why they wished to keep the apartment.

Fylkesnes joined the Socialist Left Party's negotiating team to form a new government on 27 September 2021 in Hurdal. He vowed to contribute effectively, "take quick decisions and whatever it takes".

Following his party's withdrawal from government negotiations on 29 September, Fylkesnes was appointed to head a negotiation unit in the Storting.

In August 2022, he was open to his party withdrawing their cooperation with the Støre government on the state budget for 2023 if they went ahead with an electricity support package to the business industry.

After Audun Lysbakken announced that he would not be seeking re-election as leader, Fylkesnes was floated as a possible contender to succeed him, alongside Kirsti Bergstø and Kari Elisabeth Kaski. Ultimately, Knag Fylkesnes did not seek to become leader and was instead re-elected at the 2023 party convention, continuing under Kirsti Bergstø.

References 

Socialist Left Party (Norway) politicians
Members of the Storting
Troms politicians
1975 births
Living people
21st-century Norwegian politicians